Zaza Dianozovych Zazirov (born April 25, 1972, in Gori, Georgian SSR) is a former Ukrainian wrestler and Olympic medalist. He received a bronze medal at the 1996 Summer Olympics in Atlanta. He obtained one silver medal and one bronze medal at the FILA Wrestling World Championships.

References

External links

1972 births
Living people
Wrestlers at the 1996 Summer Olympics
Wrestlers at the 2000 Summer Olympics
Ukrainian male sport wrestlers
Olympic bronze medalists for Ukraine
Olympic wrestlers of Ukraine
Olympic medalists in wrestling
Ukrainian people of Ossetian descent
Ossetian people
People from Gori, Georgia
World Wrestling Championships medalists
Medalists at the 1996 Summer Olympics